The Guru Nanak Temple is a Sikh Gurdwara situated in the town of Gravesend, Kent. It is the largest Gurdwara in Europe and also one of the largest outside India.

The complex has 3 prayer rooms and 2 langar halls. There is a building used for panjabi lessons nearby, called Punjabi School, and as a day centre for the elderly community. There is also a sports hall hosting activities including boxing, basketball and karate. The grounds are used for outdoor sports including football and are where the Gravesend Guru Nanak Football Club plays.

Gravesend Guru Nanak Football Club
This football club has a female section, where 70 women and girls play.  they first entered team(s) in the FA People's Cup in 2019. 
In addition to Sikh players, they have Muslims, Polish, English, Asian and black players. 
The football club was started up by Parm Gill and, in recognition, UEFA rewarded her in 2018, with a UEFA Grassroots gold award for her leadership qualities.  This was presented by the UEFA President Aleksander Čeferin, at UEFA's headquarters in Switzerland.

Presidency
The current president is Manpreet Singh Dhaliwal.

The father of Slough MP Tan Dhesi, Jaspal Singh Dhesi, served as the previous president of Guru Nanak Darbar Gurdwara.

References

External links 

Gurdwaras in England
Gravesend, Kent
Religious buildings and structures in Kent